Dasylophia is a genus of moths of the family Notodontidae first described by Alpheus Spring Packard in 1864.

Species
Dasylophia anguina (J. E. Smith, 1797)
Dasylophia lucia Schaus, 1901
Dasylophia lupia (Druce, 1887)
Dasylophia seriata (Druce, 1887)
Dasylophia thyatiroides (Walker, 1862)

References

Notodontidae